The Cabinda War is an ongoing separatist insurgency, waged by the Front for the Liberation of the Enclave of Cabinda (FLEC) against the government of Angola. FLEC aims at the restoration of the self-proclaimed Republic of Cabinda, located within the borders of the Cabinda province of Angola.

Background
The first Western exploration of the area of modern-day Cabinda was undertaken by navigator Diogo Cão in 1483, later falling under Portuguese influence. In 1853 a delegation of Cabindan chiefs unsuccessfully requested the extension of Portuguese administration from the colony of Angola to Cabinda. Local chiefs continued their attempts at cooperating with Portugal until the 1884 Berlin Conference and the 1885 Treaty of Simulambuco, following which the Cabindan enclave became a Portuguese protectorate. Despite the fact that Cabinda held a semi independent status, a new Portuguese government elected in 1956 transferred the region's administration to Angola without a prior agreement with Cabinda's local leadership.

The first Cabindan separatist movement known as Associação dos Indígenas do Enclave de Cabinda (AlEC) was formed in 1956, AIEC advocated the creation of a union between Cabinda and Belgian Congo or French Congo. Associação dos Ressortissants do Enclave de Cabinda (AREC) was founded in 1959 as humanitarian organisation, AREC was renamed into Freedom Movement for the State of Cabinda (MLEC), shifting its role into a political movement promoting self-determination. The National Action Committee of the Cabindan People (CAUNC) and the Mayombé Alliance (ALLIAMA) joined the growing political scene in the same year. In 1963, MLEC, ALLIAMA and CAUNC merged into the Front for the Liberation of the Enclave of Cabinda (FLEC), which had since been the largest self-determination movement in the region.

On the same year, the Organisation of African Unity declared that Cabinda is an independently governed state with its own independence movement. On 10 January 1967, FLEC formed a government in exile based in the town of Tshela, Zaire. In August 1974, FLEC absorbed the Democratic Union of Cabindan Peoples and the Democratic Party of Cabinda, becoming the sole political organisation in Cabinda.

In January 1975 under pressure from Angolan liberation movements, Portugal accepted Cabinda as part of Angola in the Alvor Agreement where the 3 Angolan independence movements (MPLA, UNITA and FNLA) were present, denying Cabinda the right to self-determination previously granted by the U.N. Chart/Right to Self-determination and the Treaty of Simulambuco. On 1 August 1975, FLEC president Luis Ranque Franque announced the formation of the Republic of Cabinda, an independent state. The MPLA troops controlling the region at the time ignored the statement. In November 1975, Angola gained independence from Portugal, claiming Cabinda as part of its territory. The provisional Cabindan government, led by the FLEC, was overturned. On 8 November 1975, FLEC responded by initiating armed struggle, aiming at creating a separate Cabindan state.

Conflict
In the course of the Angolan Civil War, FLEC split into five independent factions. FLEC-Posição Militar (FLEC-PM) was later renamed
into FLEC-Renovada (FLEC-R), FLEC-N'Zita, FLEC-Lubota, União Nacional de Libertação de Cabinda (UNLC) and the Communist Committee of Cabinda. As the war continued the MPLA led government attempted to gain the support of the various FLEC factions and enter negotiations. On the other hand, UNITA rebels directly collaborated with FLEC-FAC, while seeking to broaden its alliance with the group. The above did not stop UNITA from occasionally collaborating with MPLA in anti-FLEC operations. In 2002, the Angolan government signed a peace deal with UNITA officially ending the civil war.

Cuba, East Germany and the Soviet Union entered the civil war on MPLA's side in 1975, soon invading Cabinda.
According to U.S. intelligence services, France and Belgium allegedly supported FLEC by providing training and financial aid, despite the fact that Zaire remained FLEC's main foreign supporter. FLEC-Renovada received support from a number of US, South African and Japanese right wing organisations as well as the World League for Freedom and Democracy.

In 1956, oil was first discovered in the region; by 1966, Gulf Oil Company began commercial exploitation. The large amounts of revenue generated by oil royalties contributed to the rise of Cabinda's geopolitical significance. By 1970, oil revenues amounted to $16 million and were expected to rise to $32–50 million by 1972. Oil continued to play an important role; by 2011 it represented approximately 86% of the Angolan state's total earnings. The marginalisation of the local population in favor of Portuguese and later Angolan interests played an important role in the rise of separatist militancy in the region.

On 18 July 2006, the Cabinda Forum for Dialogue (FCD) and FLEC-Renovada led by António Bento Bembe signed a second definite cease fire with the Angolan government known as the Memorandum of Understanding for Peace in Cabinda. The event took place in Macabi, Cabinda. The agreement assured Cabinda's status as a part of Angola, provided special economic status and local governance powers to Cabinda, and condemned further acts of insurgency and separatism. The treaty received criticism from Bembe's opponents within the movement. The peace accord marked a sharp decrease in the conflict's intensity.

According to the Unrepresented Nations and Peoples Organization, Cabinda is under military occupation, reinforced in recent times by Angolan forces. This was especially true after the Togo national football team was attacked by the FLEC, when Angola was hosting the 2010 African Cup of Nations. Rebel forces claimed it was a mistake. In 2012, FLEC-FAC announced its readiness to declare a ceasefire and pursue a negotiated resolution to the conflict.

International intervention in the conflict has been limited, with Portugal offering a mediation role and letting the FLEC rule a delegation in Lisbon.

Timeline

1975–2006
 8 November 1975, FLEC initiated its armed struggle, aiming at creating a separate Cabindan state.
 9 November 1975, FLEC clashed with MPLA troops. A total of 600 Cabindan MPLA soldiers defected to FLEC following rumors of a large scale Congolese invasion into the region, the defectors reportedly brought Soviet made heavy weaponry.
 11–14 June 1977, fire was exchanged between FLEC fighters and government forces leading to several casualties.
 27 July 1979, 7 militants were killed in three separate incidents, as clashes took place in Pangamongo, Tando-Makuku, and Seva.
 20 August 1979, insurgents killed 2 East German and 3 Cuban soldiers outside Inhuca and Buco-Zau.
 22 May 1981, an Angolan court sentenced 6 people to death for belonging to FLEC.
 25 April 1990, FLEC-N'zita militants abducted 4 French and 4 Congolese Elf Aquitaine personnel, the hostages were released following negotiations with French officials.
 20 September 1990, FLEC-N'zita rebels kidnapped 2 Portuguese Mota e Companhia Limitada employees, they were released two months later.
 21 April 1990, FLEC perpetrated a grenade attack on a market in the city of Cabinda, injuring 24 people.
 7 June 1991, FLEC appealed to the Angolan government, calling for a referendum on Cabinda's autonomy status.
 29–30 September 1992, general elections were held in Angola, turnout in Cabinda ranged between 7–12% following a call by FLEC for a boycott.
 29 September 1995, FLEC-Renovada signed a four-month cease-fire with the Angolan government.
 18–22 November 1995, the Cabinda Democratic Front and the Angolan government held talks in Point Noire, Congo, failing to reach an agreement.
 23 January 1996, FLEC guerrillas abducted 3 mining workers.
 11 December 1996, an engagement between FAA and FLEC lead to the deaths of 29 people.
 5 March 1997, 42 soldiers were killed in a battle with Cabindan separatist guerrillas.
 26 March 1997, 2 FLEC-FAC militants and 27 soldiers were killed as fighting erupted in northeastern Cabinda.
 10–20 June 1997, over 100 people were killed as government troops engaged in heavy clashes with separatists.
 8 January 1998, FAA suffered 24 combat casualties as a result of fighting with FLEC.
 28 March 1998, FLEC-FAC militants attacked two civilian vehicles killing a single person.
 4 October 1998, a FAA offensive in Cabinda resulted in the combined deaths of 200 people.
 11 November 1998, an Angolan army shelling killed 7 civilians and wounded 19 others.
 24 November 1998, 11 FAA personnel lost their lives in an attack by FLEC.
 14 June 1999, FLEC targeted the village of Bulo, slaying 4 civilians and injuring 6 others.
 18 April 2002, 12 soldiers were killed in the aftermath of clashes with FLEC.
 30 October 2002, FLEC-FAC guerrillas captured the biggest military base in Cabinda known as Kungo Shonzo, located 100 kilometers northeast of the city of Cabinda.
 2 January 2003, Angolan troops captured two FLEC-Renovada officers and seized a large cache of weaponry and explosives.
 8 June 2003, 7 FLEC-FAC commanders including chief of staff Francisco Luemba surrendered to Angolan authorities.
 17 June 2003, Angolan security forces murdered two civilians in the Buco-Zau district.
 29 November 2003, a total of 1,000 former FLEC fighters and their relatives were officially integrated into the Angolan army, police force and civil society.
 24 December 2003, FLEC conducted an ambush in the Buco-Zau district, killing 3 security personnel and 3 civilians.
 17 November 2004, 53 FLEC-FAC rebels abandoned armed struggle and surrendered to the authorities of the Buco-Zau district.

2006–present
 On 18 July 2006, the Cabinda Forum for Dialogue (FCD) and FLEC-Renovada led by António Bento Bembe signed a second definite cease fire with the Angolan government known as the Memorandum of Understanding for Peace in Cabinda, the event took place in Macabi, Cabinda. The agreement assured Cabinda's status as a part of Angola, provided special economic status and local governance powers to Cabinda, and condemned further acts of insurgency and separatism. The treaty received criticism from Bembe's opponents within the movement.
 10 September 2007, António Bento Bembe was appointed to the post of minister without portfolio as part of the 2006 peace deal.
 11 December 2007, 95 former FLEC insurgents joined the ranks of the 11th Unit of the Riot Police, the event was part of the 18 July 2006 peace deal.
 3 March 2008, FLEC separatists killed three FAA soldiers in the city of Cabinda.
 27 March 2009, FLEC-FAC rebels attacked a convoy of three Chinese owned trucks in the outskirts of Cacongo, killing one Chinese national. At least 8 people were arrested for allegedly perpetrating the attack.
 1 April 2009, an army patrol came under attack by suspected militants in the area of Cacongo.
 8 January 2010, FLEC perpetrated an attack on the Togo national football team, leaving 3 people dead and 9 wounded.
 9 July 2010, Henrique N'zita Tiago stated that FLEC will discontinue its armed struggle and offered to restart peace talks, FLEC Renovada commander Alexandre Builo Tati echoed the statement.
 8 November 2010, FLEC militants ambushed a convoy carrying Chinese workers, 2 Angolan soldiers were killed in the incident.
 2–26 March 2011, Angolan secret services carried out a number of assassinations targeting FLEC commanders. FLEC-N'Zita head of staff, Gabriel "Firefly" Pea was assassinated in Ponta Negra, Republic of the Congo, on March 2. FLEC-FAC chief of staff Gabriel "Pirilampo" Nhemba was found dead in the village of N'tando, Republic of the Congo, on March 14. FLEC operational commander of Northern Region, Maurice "Sabata" Lubota's body was found in the vicinity of Kimongo, Republic of the Congo, on March 26.
 20 December 2014, guerrillas ambushed an army vehicle in the outskirts of Vito Novo, Buco-Zau municipality, killing 4 and wounding 7 soldiers.
 22 December 2014, a skirmish took place in Ntataba, Buco-Zau, resulting in 1 death and one injury among the ranks of the government troops.
 May 2016, rebels boarded an offshore oil rig and threatened the workers there.
 25–28 July 2016, FLEC claimed to have killed nine Angolan soldiers and wounded another 14.
 30 March 2020, inspired by a call from the Organization of Emerging African States and a similar move by SOCADEF, Cabindan militias declared a unilateral ceasefire to help combat the COVID-19 pandemic
 At least 2 FLEC-FAC guerrillas were killed in clashes with the Angolan military in June 2020
 30 August 2022, 18 government soldiers were killed in the Necuto area of Cabinda

Human Rights Violations
According to a Human Rights Watch report, the Angolan military and secret service have committed a number of human rights violations during the conflict. The report indicates that between September 2007 and March 2009, 38 people were arbitrary detained, tortured, humiliated and later put on trial for alleged security crimes. The arrested included six members of the Angolan military who were charged with desertion and carrying out armed attacks, as well as a former Voice of America journalist, known for his criticism of the government. The detainees were denied contact with legal professionals or their families for prolonged periods of time. The above are considered to be a violation of the International Covenant on Civil and Political Rights.
A Bertelsmann Stiftung investigation covering the period between 2011 and 2013, indicated that systematic human rights violations have taken place, with journalists, civil rights activists and clergy members receiving harassment after being accused of supporting FLEC.
Reports by Freedom House, Bertelsmann Stiftung and Human Rights Watch also pointed out at violations committed by FLEC.

See also

Congo Crisis
Casamance conflict
Resource curse

References

External links
 Website of FLEC in Exile

Separatism in Angola
Cabinda independence movement
Wars involving Angola
Conflicts in 2022
Cold War conflicts
Cold War in Africa
MPLA
Wars involving the states and peoples of Africa
Civil wars involving the states and peoples of Africa
Civil wars post-1945
20th-century conflicts
21st-century conflicts
Guerrilla wars
Proxy wars